Victoria Harriet Lucy Bridgeman, Viscountess Bridgeman  (née Turton; born 1942) is the founder of the Bridgeman Art Library, a for-profit company that provides a large collection of fine art images and the Artists' Collecting Society, a not-for-profit Community Interest Company dedicated to the collection of the Artists’ Resale Right (Droit de Suite) and copyright on behalf of artists and artists’ estates in both the UK and the EEA.

Early life and education
Born to Ralph Meredyth Turton and Mary Blanche Chetwynd-Stapylton in County Durham, England, she is one of four daughters. Throughout her early youth, she was educated at home by a governess, under the Parents' National Educational Union System. She then attended St Mary's School in Wantage, Berkshire, and Trinity College, Dublin, graduating with a Master of Arts degree.

After graduating in 1964, she worked as an editorial trainee with The Lady magazine. Continuing with her passion for writing, in 1965, she was appointed Executive Editor for a weekly monograph called The Masters. Following this, she conceived, edited and produced another weekly magazine, Discovering Antiques, for which she formed her own production company, Harriet Bridgeman Ltd. The many books written, edited, and co-authored by her include The Encyclopaedia of Victoriana and The British Eccentric.

In 1966, she married Robin Bridgeman, the third Viscount of that name, producing a family of four sons, including Luke Bridgeman, heir apparent to the patrilineal title.

Bridgeman Library
During her time as an editor and author, Bridgeman discovered the need for easier access to illustrations of works of art. There was no central and convenient way to obtain colour transparencies or black-and-white prints other than by going from museum to museum. The concept of the Bridgeman Art Library emerged in 1972 and developed to allow users to access thousands of images at the same time providing extra income for the museums, collections, artists and institutions which it represents. The library now has offices in Germany, France, Italy, England, and the United States and Lady Bridgeman continues to travel internationally in order to support the development of collections and the access to arts generally.

In addition to running the Library, Bridgeman was a founder member of BAPLA British Association of Picture Libraries and Agencies and has chaired their executive committee with special responsibility for copyright.  She compiled their first publication on the standardisation of terms in use in the picture industry.  She also represents The Artists' Collecting Society CIC on the British Copyright Council (BCC), was a Trustee of the British Sporting Art Trust and the Imperial College Healthcare Charity, and is a member of the Intellectual Property Advisory Committee (IPAC) and a Director of the International Catalogue Raisonné Association (ICRA). She also sits on the council of the Artists' General Benevolence Institution.

Awards

In 1997, Bridgeman was awarded the European Women of Achievement Award in the Arts.  The award was given in recognition of the Bridgeman Art Library's promotion of European culture and the European scope of its clients, collections and research.  In 2005, she was voted the International Business Woman of the Year by the judges of the International Business Awards. She has been given funding for three research projects within the arts by the European Union. In 2006, she founded a Community Interest Company, the Artists' Collecting Society to collect Artists’ Resale Right (Droit de Suite) on behalf of UK-based artists which includes, amongst its many members, Frank Auerbach and the estates of Lucian Freud, Barbara Hepworth, and Howard Hodgkin.

Lady Bridgeman was appointed Commander of the Order of the British Empire (CBE) in the 2014 New Year Honours for her "services to art".

References

Sources

External links

 Q&A with Harriet Bridgeman Art of England, July 2012 (copy at bridgemanimages.com)
  Catherine Gaffney: Picture perfect: a profile of Lady Harriet Bridgeman. Trinity News, 22 October 2010 
www.debretts.com

1942 births
Living people
Alumni of Trinity College Dublin
Harriet
English art historians
English editors
English women non-fiction writers
British viscountesses
People educated at St Mary’s School, Wantage
People educated at Heathfield School, Ascot
Commanders of the Order of the British Empire
People from County Durham
British Eurosceptics
Women art historians
British women historians